KFD may refer to:

 Karnataka Forum for Dignity
 Kinetic family drawing
 Knoxville Fire Department
 Kyasanur forest disease
 Kitchener Fire Department
 Kikuchi-Fujimoto disease